Ghalia Sebti (born 19 July 1968) is a Moroccan alpine skier. She competed in two events at the 1992 Winter Olympics.

References

1968 births
Living people
Moroccan female alpine skiers
Olympic alpine skiers of Morocco
Alpine skiers at the 1992 Winter Olympics
Place of birth missing (living people)